Aluak (also Romanized as Ālū’ak) is a village in Yateri Rural District,  in the Central District of Aradan County, Semnan Province, Iran. At the 2006 census, its population was 6, in 4 families.

References 

Populated places in Aradan County